Vold is a Norwegian and Danish surname. 

Notable people with the surname include:

Jan Erik Vold (born 1939), Norwegian poet, writer and translator
Johan Vold (born 1947), Norwegian businessman
Per Terje Vold (born 1945), Norwegian businessman and civil servant
Ragnar Vold (1906–1967), Norwegian journalist and writer
Regitze R. (Gitte) Vold (1937-1999), Danish-born American chemist and biochemist

See also
Christianshavns Vold, former rampart and park in Copenhagen, Denmark
Vold Station, defunct railway station in Norway
Wold (disambiguation)